The Pratt & Whitney R-1860 Hornet B was a relatively uncommon aircraft engine. Cylinder bore was increased by 1/8" and the crankshaft stroke by 3/8". Both engines were air-cooled radial engines, with a single row of nine cylinders.

Design and development

The cylinder and valve design was typical for Pratt & Whitney, a simple design with two large valves driven by pushrods. The enlarged engine was designed by George Willgoos and was first available in 1929.

The Hornet series of engines was similar to the Wasp, but larger. In both series a nine-cylinder single-row engine was later supplemented by an enlarged fourteen cylinder engine, with two rows of the same cylinders, but reduced in number to seven per row to aid cooling to the rear row (it was never made into a larger, 18 cylinder radial like the related Wasp was).

Two of these engines, the enlarged single-row Hornet B described here and the R-1830 Twin Wasp, were of near-identical displacement (1860 vs. 1830), although the fourteen-cylinder Twin Wasp was more complex and costly than the nine-cylinder, single-row Hornet B. The Twin Wasp was by far the more powerful engine though, even in its early versions it produced 800 bhp to the Hornet B's 575 bhp. Having more cylinders per the same displacement also creates a smoother engine, since the individual pistons are smaller and lighter, and the stroke is shorter, which reduces the vibration of reciprocation, and therefore crew and mechanical fatigue. The reduced stroke also allows for a higher maximum RPM limit, since the mean piston speed is reduced, the distance the piston has to cover per each engine revolution being shorter. Having a shorter stroke but a higher rpm limit for the same displacement reduces the peak torque levels, but allows for a higher maximum horsepower rating. A further advantage was the reduced diameter of the Wasp: 48 inches compared to 57. This reduced drag, and the relatively large diameter of the Hornet would also have been a serious drawback for visibility if used in a small single-engined aircraft.

Although a technically competent design, the enlarged Hornet B engine was not a commercial success. Customers preferred to buy the R-1830 Twin Wasp instead, which in time became the most numerous aircraft engine ever produced.

Applications
 Bellanca C-27 Airbus
 Boeing Monomail
 Boeing YB-9
 Consolidated Commodore
 Consolidated Fleetster
 Fokker F-32
 Keystone B-4A
 Keystone LB-8 (prototype only)
 Keystone XLB-12 (engine evaluation testbed only)
 Martin XT6M (prototype only)
 Sikorsky S-40 
 Sikorsky S-41

Specifications

See also

References
Notes

Bibliography

External links

1920s aircraft piston engines
Aircraft air-cooled radial piston engines
R-1860